Aubrey Tlali Mathibe (born 16 July 1980 in Kroonstad, Free State) is a South African football (soccer) goalkeeper. He played for the Premier Soccer League club AmaZulu.

Career
His previous clubs are Kaizer Chiefs, Moroka Swallows and Thanda Royal Zulu. Mathibe was a reserve goalkeeper for Kaizer Chiefs, making just one competitive appearance in eight years with the club.

References

External links
Profile at Soccerway

1980 births
South African soccer players
Living people
Association football goalkeepers
Kaizer Chiefs F.C. players
Moroka Swallows F.C. players
Black Leopards F.C. players
Thanda Royal Zulu F.C. players
People from Kroonstad
AmaZulu F.C. players
Soccer players from the Free State (province)